The Turkish Patent and Trademark Office ( or TÜRKPATENT) (TURKPATENT) is an intellectual property organization with a special budget being attached to the Ministry of Industry and Technology of the Republic of Turkey. Established on June 24, 1994, in Ankara as an independent legal entity, it is liable under special judiciary provisions with the objective of supporting the technological development in Turkey and of establishing and protecting of industrial property rights, as well as providing the public with the worldwide information on industrial property rights.

In October 2016, the Turkish Patent and Trademark Office has been appointed as International Searching and Preliminary Examining Authority under the Patent Cooperation Treaty (PCT). As of October 2016, the appointment was not effective yet.

Organs and administrative units
Managing Board 
Advisory Board
Presidency
Re-examination and Evaluation Board
Main Administrative Units
Auxiliary Service Units
Consultancy Units

References

External links
 

Patent
International Searching and Preliminary Examining Authorities
Intellectual property organizations
Patent offices
Turkish intellectual property law
Organizations based in Ankara
Government agencies established in 1994